Princess Nafije Zogu (1896–1955), was an Albanian princess.

Life
She was the daughter of Xhemal Pasha Zogu and Sadijé Toptani, and was one the six sisters of King Zog I of Albania. She married Cena Bey Kryeziu, who were killed after a conflict with her brother in 1927. 

When her brother became monarch in 1928, she and her siblings were granted the status of Prince and Princess Zogu. 
In contrast to the younger sisters of the king, Princess Senije, Ruhije Zogu, Myzejen Zogu and Maxhide Zogu, who all played public roles and performed royal representational duties during the reign of king Zogu, the two elder sisters, Princess Adile Zogu and Nafije Zogu, lived a retired life in the royal household and did not have any public role. However, when the king banned the hijab in 1937, he made sure his sisters appeared in public without veils and dressed in Western fashion as role models for other women, and while Nafije did not appear in public, she did follow the policy of her brother and discarded her veil that year.

Exile
She left Albania with the rest of the royal family in 1939 upon the outbreak of World War II, and followed the former monarch in exile to Great Britain in 1940. She, as well as the rest of the sisters except Adile, followed Zog to Egypt in 1946. In 1955, she and the rest of the family followed Zog to France, where he died. She lived in France with her sisters until her death.

References 

 Christo Dako, Zog the First, King of the Albanians, Tirana, 1937.
 Josephine Dedet, Geraldine, Reine des Albanais, Paris, Criterion, 1997.
 Charles Fenyvesi, Splendor in exile, Washington, New Republic Books, 1979.
 Anastas Frashëri, Cila ka qënë N.M. Saj Sadije Zogu [Who was H.M .Queen Mother Sadije Zogu], Tirana, « Tirana », 1935.
 Patrice Najbor, Histoire de l’Albanie et de sa Maison Royale 1443-2007, 5 vol., Je Publie, 2008.
 Neil Rees, A Royal Exile - King Zog & Queen Geraldine of Albania in exile..., Studge Publications, 2010.
 Gwen Robyns, Geraldine of the Albanians, London, Muller, Blond & White limited, 1987
 Joseph Swire, Albania – The Rise of a Kingdom, New York, Arno Press & The New York Times, 1971.
 Jason Tomes, King Zog. Self-made Monarch of Albania, Sutton Publishing Limited, 2003.
 Tomes, Jason: King Zog: Self-Made Monarch of Albania
 Ingrid Sharp, Matthew Stibbe: Aftermaths of War: Women's Movements and Female Activists, 1918-1923

1896 births
1955 deaths
Albanian royalty
Place of birth missing
20th-century Albanian women
People from Mat (municipality)
People from Scutari vilayet
House of Zogu
Albanian expatriates in Egypt
Albanian expatriates in France